Legalise Cannabis Queensland (registered with the Electoral Commission Queensland as Legalise Cannabis Qld (Party)) is a political party based in Queensland, Australia. LCQ  has a number of policies that centre around the personal, medical and industrial uses of cannabis.

The party was formed in 2020, and ran 23 candidates in the Queensland state election in that year. They received over 26,000 votes and 0.91% of the total first preference votes statwide, gaining over 5% of the vote in some areas and 3 – 4% in others, Ian Zunker received the party's biggest share of first preference votes in the state, with 5.51% in the electorate of Bundaberg. The party finished as the sixth largest party by number of votes out of the twelve parties that contested the election.

Formation 
The Legalise Cannabis Queensland Party was established when a group of like minded people containing members from the H.E.M.P. Party, Medical Cannabis Users Association of Australia (MCUA) and their associated networks formed a Facebook group with the intention of standing as independents in the October 2020 Queensland state election with the view of working loosely together to push for cannabis law reform in Queensland and share resources. They met in person on several occasions to discuss issues and policy. Then one person suggested maybe a political party would be a better way. The party met the membership requirements for registration within a fortnight and on 1 July 2020 they submitted registration paperwork to the Electoral Commission of Queensland to run candidates at the October Queensland state election. The party was registered as a political party by ECQ on 9 September 2020.

See also 
 Cannabis in Australia 
 Drug policy reform
 Legalise Cannabis Australia
 Legalise Cannabis Western Australia Party

References

External links
Official website
LCQ Party Constitution and Rules

2020 establishments in Australia
Political parties established in 2020
Cannabis political parties of Australia
Political parties in Queensland